"Are You Lovin' Me Like I'm Lovin' You" is a song written by Johnny Cunningham and Steve Stone, and recorded by American country music artist Ronnie Milsap.  It was released in March 1991 as the first single from the album Back to the Grindstone.  The song reached #3 on the Billboard Hot Country Singles & Tracks chart.

Chart performance

Year-end charts

References

1991 songs
1991 singles
Ronnie Milsap songs
RCA Records Nashville singles